Terence O'Sullivan (1924 – 14 March 1997) was an Irish Fianna Fáil politician. He was a member of Seanad Éireann from 1969 to 1973. He was nominated by the Taoiseach to the 12th Seanad in 1969. He lost his seat at the 1973 Seanad election.

References

1924 births
1997 deaths
Fianna Fáil senators
Members of the 12th Seanad
Nominated members of Seanad Éireann